"Let's kill all the lawyers" is a quotation from the William Shakespeare play Henry VI, Part 2. It may also refer to:
Let's Kill All the Lawyers, a 1992 American film
"...Let's Kill All The Lawyers!," title of an issue of The Trial Of James T. Kirk series of Star Trek comics
Kill all the Lawyers, a novel by Paul Levine
"First Thing We Do, Let's Kill All the Lawyers", an episode from season two of the US television series The Newsroom